Piero Portaluppi (19 March 1888 – 6 July 1967) was an Italian architect.

Biography 
Pietro (known as Piero) Portaluppi was born in Milan, son of the engineer Luisa Gadda e Oreste Portaluppi.

He graduated in 1905 from the Istituto Tecnico Carlo Cattaneo and registered at the Politecnico, studying with Enrico Agostino Griffini and Carlo Calzecchi. During this time, he worked as a caricaturist with the satirical newspapers Il Babau, A quel paese, and Guerin Meschino.

In September 1910, he graduated as an architect and won the Gold Medal of the College of Engineers and Architects of Milan, as its laureate. For the Conti Electrical Company, he worked on hydroelectric plants, mostly located in Formazza. The most famous are in Verampio (1912–1917), Valdo (1920–1923), Crevoladossola (1923–1924), and Cadarese (1925–1929). For the Azienda Elettrica Municipale di Milano, he designed the plant of Grosio (1918–1920).

During the First World War, Portaluppi worked for the military in the Veneto and Friuli Regions. He resumed his professional activity after the war, rebuilding la Pinacoteca di Brera, the Villa Fossati, and the Casa degli Atellani in Corso Magenta, the home of Ettore Conti. Conti introduced Portaluppi to Milan's high society and he started to have the city's most important families as clients such as Borletti, Fossati, Venti and Crespi, Angelo Campiglio, and Mino Brughera. In 1920, Portaluppi designed two projects that are viewed as emblematic of his architecture: the skyscraper S.K.N.E. for the area of Allabanuel, and an utopian city, Hellytown.

Other projects during this period were the Palazzo della Banca Commerciale Italiana (1928–1932), the Planetarium Hoepli (1929–1930), residential buildings for the Buonarroti-Carpaccio-Giotto family (1926–1930), the Casa Crespi on Corso Venezia (1927–1930), and the Palazzo Crespi on Corso Giacomo Matteotti (1928–1932). He designed the Italian Pavilion for the Universal Exposition in Barcelona in 1929.

Between 1934 and 1938, he work on the historic restoration of the Church of Santa Maria delle Grazie and he continued that work after the war.

Following the Second World War, he devoted himself increasingly to teaching and professional organizations. He continued to design and collaborated on later architectural projects with Gio Ponti (1956–1962).

In July 1913, Portaluppi married Lia Baglia. They had two children: Luisa and Oreste (known familiarly as Tuccio). His son Tuccio died in the Second World War. On 6 July 1967, Piero Portaluppi died in his house on Corso Magenta in Milan.

The Villa Necchi Campiglio was a principal shooting location for Luca Guadagnino's film I Am Love (2009).

Publications (in Italian) 
 Piero Portaluppi, Aedilitia I, Bestetti e Tumminelli, Milano-Roma 1924.
 Piero Portaluppi, Marco Semenza, Milano com'è ora come sarà, Bestetti e Tumminelli, Milano-Roma 1927.
 Piero Portaluppi, Aedilitia II, Bestetti e Tumminelli, Milano-Roma 1930.

References

External links 

 Piero Portaluppi Foundation Official site
 Catalogo della mostra Piero Portaluppi – Linea errante nell’architettura del Novecento
 

1888 births
1967 deaths
Modernist architects
20th-century Italian architects
Architecture educators
Architects from Milan